Angus East was a Scottish county constituency represented in the House of Commons of the Parliament of the United Kingdom from 1983 until 1997, when it was replaced largely by Angus with smaller proportions moving to Tayside North, Dundee East and Dundee West.  Between 1950 and 1983, the area had been represented by the North Angus & Mearns and South Angus constituencies.

It elected one Member of Parliament (MP), using the first-past-the-post voting system.

Boundaries
The Angus District electoral divisions of Aberbrothock, Arbroath Elliot, Arbroath St Vigeans, Brechin, Carnoustie, Eastern Glens, Montrose Lunan, and Montrose Northesk, and the City of Dundee District electoral divisions of Monifieth and Sidlaw.

Members of Parliament

Elections

Elections in the 1980s

Elections in the 1990s

References 

History of Angus, Scotland
Historic parliamentary constituencies in Scotland (Westminster)
Constituencies of the Parliament of the United Kingdom established in 1983
Constituencies of the Parliament of the United Kingdom disestablished in 1997